Padmarajan (23 May 1945 – 24 January 1991) was an Indian author, screenwriter, and film director. His stories deal with deceit, murder, romance, mystery, passion, jealousy, libertinism, anarchism, individualism, and the life of peripheral elements of society.  Some of them are considered as among the best in Malayalam literature.

Padmarajan was noted for his fine and detailed screenwriting and expressive direction style. The follow list details all of his known written and directorial published works.

Novels

Short stories

Films

Bibliographies by writer